Brown Springs,  Oklahoma

Brown Springs, Oklahoma is a location near Thackerville, Oklahoma. 

Over the last couple of decades, bodies have been discovered in the springs. These people met violent deaths in Dallas and then were taken to their final resting place in Brown Springs. Several were found in the 1970s. Then, one in 1989. One of the last ones found was a woman from Gainesville. In 1997, she was found in the springs on top of her car.

References

Bodies of water of Love County, Oklahoma